Mehmood Qadir Khan Leghari is a Pakistani politician who was a Member of the Provincial Assembly of the Punjab, from May 2013 to May 2018.

Early life and education
He was born on 1 January 1963 in Dera Ghazi Khan.

He has the degree of Master of Business Administration which he obtained in 1987 from University of the Punjab.

Political career

He was elected to the Provincial Assembly of the Punjab as an independent candidate from Constituency PP-246 (Dera Ghazi Khan-VII) in 2013 Pakistani general election. He joined Pakistan Muslim League (N) in May 2013.

In December 2013, he was appointed as Parliamentary Secretary for Chief Minister's Inspection Team.

He has also served as Tehsil Nazim, Dera Ghazi Khan from 2005 to 2009.

References

Living people
Punjab MPAs 2013–2018
1963 births
Pakistan Muslim League (N) politicians